Lanett City School District  is a school district in Chambers County, Alabama, United States. It was established in 1898.

Schools
Lanett Senior High School was recognized in the National Ranking and earned a Bronze Medal by U.S. News & World Report in 2017, 2015, 2014, and 2013. Schools are ranked based on their performance on state-required tests and how well they prepare students for college.

The Public Affairs Research Council of Alabama showed that Lanett High exceeds state average of graduates enrolled in Higher Education as of 2015.

W.O. Lance Elementary was awarded the CLAS School of Distinction Award for its innovative Wellness Clinic. The CLAS School of Distinction Award recognizes schools or programs that serve as outstanding educational models for other schools in Alabama.

Statewide testing ranks the schools in Alabama. Those in the bottom six percent are listed as "failing." As of early 2018, Lanett Senior High School was included in this category.

Athletics
Lanett High School won the Boy's 2A State Basketball Championship in 2016.

Lanett High School won the Boy's 2A State Basketball Championship in 2017.

Lanett High school won the State 2A Football Championship in 2017.

References

External links
 

School districts in Alabama
1898 establishments in Alabama
School districts established in 1898